The following elections occurred in the year 1977.

Africa
 1977 Afars and Issas Constituent Assembly election
 1977 Algerian legislative election
 1977 Gambian general election
 1976–1977 Guinea-Bissau legislative election
 1977 Malagasy parliamentary election
 1977 Moroccan parliamentary election
 1977 Mozambican general election
 1977 Rhodesian general election
 1977 Sierra Leonean parliamentary election
 1977 South African general election
 1977 Zairean parliamentary election
 1977 Zairean presidential election

Asia
 1977 Indonesian legislative election
 1977 Israeli legislative election
 1977 Japanese House of Councillors election
 1977 North Korean parliamentary election
 1977 Pakistani general election
 1977 Sri Lankan parliamentary election

India
 1977 Indian general election
 1977 Indian general election in Andhra Pradesh
 1977 Indian general election in Tamil Nadu
 1977 Indian presidential election
 1977 Tamil Nadu Legislative Assembly election

Turkey
 1977 Turkish general election

Australia
 1977 Australian federal election
 1977 Northern Territory general election
 1977 Queensland state election
 1977 Australian referendum
 1977 South Australian state election
 1977 Western Australian state election

Europe
 1977 Belgian general election
 1977 Danish parliamentary election
 1977 Dutch general election
 1977 Greek legislative election
 1977 Irish general election
 1977 Norwegian parliamentary election
 1977 Turkish general election

France
 1977 French municipal elections

Spain
 1977 Spanish general election

Turkey
 1977 Turkish general election

North America
 1977 Salvadoran presidential election

Canada
 1977 Edmonton municipal election
 1977 Manitoba general election
 1977 Manitoba municipal elections
 1977 Ontario general election

United States
 1977 United States gubernatorial elections

United States gubernatorial
 1977 United States gubernatorial elections

United States mayoral
 1977 New Orleans mayoral election
 1977 New York City mayoral election
 1977 Pittsburgh mayoral election

Louisiana
 1977 New Orleans mayoral election

New York
 1977 New York City mayoral election

Pennsylvania
 1977 Pittsburgh mayoral election

Oceania
 March 1977 Fijian general election
 September 1977 Fijian general election
 1977 Papua New Guinean general election

Australia
 1977 Australian federal election
 1977 Northern Territory general election
 1977 Queensland state election
 1977 Australian referendum
 1977 South Australian state election
 1977 Western Australian state election

South America

Falkland Islands
 1977 Falkland Islands general election

Paraguay
 1977 Paraguayan Constitutional Assembly election

Suriname
 1977 Surinamese general election

See also

 
1977
Elections